Wat Umong (complete name: Wat Umong Suan Puthatham) is a 700-year-old Buddhist temple in Chiang Mai,  Thailand.

It should not be confused with the temple with a similar name within the old city moat of Chiang Mai, whose complete name is "Wat Umong Maha Thera Chan".

Location
Wat Umong is located against the mountains of Doi Suthep and is about 1 km south of the main campus of Chiang Mai University. The wat occupies a tranquil setting and a small open zoo is stationed behind it.

History

The temple was built in 1297 by King Mangrai of the Lan Na dynasty. 

Of particular interest is a modern replica of the original standing condition of the pillar of Ashoka at Sarnath in India. The Lion Capital of Ashoka survives in the Sarnath Museum, in an incomplete state, and at Indian independence was adopted as the National Emblem of India.  It consists in four lions standing on an abacus, crowned by a large wheel called a Dharmachakra.

Structure and layout

The entire Wat Umong complex consists of 37.5 rai (15 acres) of wooded grounds. You can feed the fish, turtles, and ducks in a large pond. "Talking trees" have words of wisdom in Thai and English. The wat is famous for its ancient tunnels and large chedi. There are tunnels with Buddhist images below the chedi which can be easily explored. These tunnels were supposedly built by the King and painted with bush scenes so they could keep a famous but mentally deranged monk within the grounds of the monastery as he had a habit of just wandering off into the bush for days on end. Signs (proverbs) written in English and Thai hang from the trees on footpaths leading to the small lake where fish, pigeons, and turtles can be fed.

Other attractions include a Buddha field of broken sculpture, a fasting Bodhisattva, a Spiritual Theatre of paintings similar to those at Suan Mokkh, reproductions of ancient Buddhist sculpture of India, and a library-museum. This last building offers many books on Buddhism and other philosophies as well as a collection of historic objects and Buddhist art.

Current status
Wat Umong is unique in that the resident monks live in a very natural setting, and occasionally feed the deer that live in the area. It also is possible to practice meditation at Wat Umong and to learn from the monks.

References

External links
Own website of Wat Umong

Umong
13th century in Chiang Mai